Manuel Guerrero (born c.1911) was an Argentine basketball player who competed in the 1948 Summer Olympics when they finished 15th.

References

External links
  

Argentine men's basketball players
Olympic basketball players of Argentina
Basketball players at the 1948 Summer Olympics
Year of birth missing
Year of death missing